Collector Gari Abbayi is a 1987 Indian Telugu-language action drama film, produced by Yarlagadda Surendra under S. S. Creations and directed by B. Gopal. It stars Akkineni Nageswara Rao, Nagarjuna, Sarada and Rajani, with music composed by Chakravarthy. The film was recorded as a Super Hit at the box office and remade as Hindi film Kanoon Apna Apna (1989).

Plot
Collector Rama Kantha Rao (Akkineni Nageswara Rao) is a stickler for law & order. He leads a happy family life with his wife Lakshmi Devi (Sarada), son Ravi (Akkineni Nagarjuna) and daughter Jyothi (Varalakshmi). A rift always arises between father & son as Ravi believes that sometimes acting outside the bounds of law can be justified in order to lay bare the truth. A businessman Appa Rao (Kota Srinivasa Rao) & his acolyte Eelimudrala Ellayah (Nutan Prasad), carry out their criminal activities with their sons Kanna Rao (Sudhakar) & Chinna Rao (Surya), respectively. The Collector hinders their activities, so they attempt to bribe him but fail. Ellayah contests the election with the support of Appa Rao, becomes a minister and determines to humiliate & crush the collector, but he courageously persists.
Meanwhile, Ravi falls for Bharati (Rajani), the sister of his close friend Satyam (Subhaleka Subhakar). Satyam is a journalist, and his father, Srinivasa Rao (P. L. Narayana), is an editor of a newspaper who tries to expose the nefarious face of the minister. One night, Satyam gets evidence of the minister's wrongdoings. Still, Kanna Rao & Chinna Rao kill him. Ravi witnesses the crime, but the culprits are acquitted due to fake alibis. An enraged Ravi attempts to kill them, but his father prevents him; as a result, Ravi leaves his house. The Collector starts a secret investigation and gathers evidence against the criminals. Ravi returns surprisingly as a police officer. He supports his father, but they still go in their separate ways. They both unmask the minister and remove him from power. Ellayah & the gang attack Ravi in which, unfortunately, Jyothi dies. The Collector unites with Ravi, and they bring the culprits to justice. Finally, the movie ends on a happy note as the Collector appreciates Ravi.

Cast

 Akkineni Nageswara Rao as Collector Rama Kantha Rao
 Nagarjuna as Ravi
 Rajani as Bharati 
 Sarada as Lakshmi Devi
 Nutan Prasad as Eelimudrala Ellaiah
 Kota Srinivasa Rao as Appa Rao
 Sudhakar as Kanna Rao
 Subhalekha Sudhakar as Satyam
 Surya as Chinna Rao 
 Suthi Velu  as Mallepula Madhava Rao
 P. L. Narayana as Srinivasa Rao
 Narra Venkateswara Rao as Doctor
 Srilakshmi
 Rama Prabha
 Varalakshmi as Jyothi

Soundtrack

The music was composed by Chakravarthy. Lyrics were written by Veturi. Music released on AVM Audio Company.

References

External links 
 

1987 films
1980s action drama films
Indian action drama films
1980s Telugu-language films
Films directed by B. Gopal
Films scored by K. Chakravarthy
Telugu films remade in other languages
1987 drama films